Janot is a surname. Notable people with the name include:

Denis Janot (1529–1544), French printer and bookseller 
Jérémie Janot (born 1977), French footballer
Raymond Janot (1917–2000), French politician
Rodrigo Janot (born 1956), former Prosecutor General of Brazil

See also 
 Janota